Keuka Lake Outlet is a river located in Yates County, New York. It drains Keuka Lake and flows into Seneca Lake by Dresden, New York.  
The Crooked Lake Canal was developed along the route of the river.  The canal was later replaced by a railroad which is now a hiking and cycling trail, the Keuka Outlet Trail.

See also  
 Crooked Lake Outlet Historic District

References

Rivers of Yates County, New York
Rivers of New York (state)